The fifteenth Gina Bachauer International Piano Competition took place in Salt Lake City, Utah, from June 16 to July 1, 2010. Rounds one and two were held at Rose Wagner Performing Arts Center. The final round was held at Abravanel Hall with the Utah Symphony.

Awards

Jury
9 jurors:

 Hui-Qiao Bao (China) – could not attend due to visa issues
 Bernadene Blaha (Canada) – withdrew due to personal emergency
  Gennady Dzubenko (Russia)
 Douglas Humpherys (USA)
 Dae-Jin Kim (South Korea)
 Jie Lu – replacement juror (China/USA)
 Yuko Ninomiya (Japan)
 Walter Ponce (Bolivia/USA)
 Dmitry Rachmanov (Russia) – replacement juror
 John Roos (South Africa)
 Einar Steen-Nøkleberg (Norway) – withdrew due to personal emergency
 Nelita True (USA) (chairperson)

Competition results by round

Round one and round two (semifinals, 38 competitors)

 Charlie Albright (USA)
 Yunjie Chen (China)
 Stefan Ciric (Serbia)
 Sara Daneshpour (USA)
 Gregory DeTurck (USA)
 Sebastian Di Bin (Italy)
 Nazareno Ferruggio (Italy)
 Kotaro Fukuma (Japan)
 Lukas Geniušas (Russia)
 Pavel Gintov (Ukraine)
 Dorel Golan (Israel)
 Yoonjung Han (South Korea)
 Fazliddin Husanov (Uzbekistan)
 Daria Kameneva (Russia)
 Benjamin Kim (USA)
 Soyeon Kim (South Korea)
 Andrea Lam (Australia)
 Viviana Pia Lasaracina (Italy)
 Alexei Lebedev (Russia)
 Dmitri Levkovich (Ukraine)
 Benjamin Moser (Germany)
 Seejoon Park (South Korea)
 Mayumi Sakamoto (Japan)
 Serhiy Salov (Ukraine)
 Nima Sarkechik (France)
 Anastasia Solomatina (Russia) – withdrew before Round One
 Ardita Statovci (Kosovo)
 Olga Stezhko (Belarus)
 Konstantin Soukhovetski (Ukraine)
 Alexei Sychev (Russia)
 Anastasya Terenkova (Russia)
 Matei Varga (Romania)
 David Violi (France)
 Joshua Wright (USA)
 Pavel Yeletsky (Belarus)
 Dizhou Zhao (China)
 Zhang Zuo (China)
  Darrett Zusko (Canada)

Final round (6 competitors)

External links

 Alink Argerich Foundation Alink-Argerich Foundation
 Official webpage

Gina Bachauer 15
June 2010 events in the United States
July 2010 events in the United States
2010 in Utah
2010s in Salt Lake City
2010 in American music